Malta competed in the 2014 Commonwealth Games in Glasgow, Scotland from July 23 to August 3, 2014.

Athletics

Men
Track & road events

Women
Track & road events

Field events

Gymnastics

Artistic

Women

Individuals

Judo

Men

Women

Lawn bowls

Men

Women

Shooting

Men

Women

Squash

Individual

Doubles

Triathlon

Individual

Weightlifting

Women

Wrestling

Men's freestyle

References

Nations at the 2014 Commonwealth Games
Malta at the Commonwealth Games
2014 in Maltese sport